Trimountain is a traprock mountain in Connecticut, United States.

Trimountain or Tri-Mountain may also refer to:

 Tri-Mountain State Park, the state park that encompasses Trimountain in Connecticut
 Trimountain, Michigan, a census-designated place in the United States
 Tri-Mountain National Scenic Area, a national scenic area in central Taiwan

See also 
 Three Peaks (disambiguation)
 Tri Peaks (disambiguation)
 Trio Mountain